There are several ballot measures called Measure 36:

Oregon Ballot Measure 36 (1996) (minimum wage)
Oregon Ballot Measure 36 (2004) (constitutional amendment to ban same sex marriage)